Charlotta Petra Sörenstam (born 16 April 1973) is a retired Swedish professional golfer. As an amateur competing for the Texas Longhorns, she won the NCAA Division I Championship individual title. As a professional, she won one tournament on the LPGA Tour and represented Europe in the Solheim Cup. Her elder sister by three years, Annika, is a Hall of Fame golfer.

Early years
Sörenstam was born in Bro near Stockholm, Sweden. Her father Tom was an IBM executive and her mother Gunilla worked in a bank.

The Sörenstam family began playing golf at Viksjö Golf Club in Jakobsberg, north of Stockholm and later switched to nearby Bro-Bålsta Golf Club, opened in 1980, initially with a 9-hole course. At the age of 9, she shared her first set of golf clubs with her sister. Annika got the odd numbered clubs and Charlotta the even.

At the European Tour tournament Scandinavian Enterprise Open in Stockholm in July 1986, the Sörenstam sisters tried to be volunteer caddies and was asked to stand in a line with all other candidates. When all male volunteer caddies finally had been chosen by the tournament professionals, three teen-age girls were left without a bag yet. It was Charlotta, Annika and Fanny Sunesson.

Amateur career 
As an amateur, Sörenstam won the 1992 Ängsö Ladies Open on the professional Swedish Golf Tour, at the time named the Lancome Tour. She represented Sweden at the 1993 European Ladies' Team Championship in The Hague, Netherlands. She finished 5th at the 1993 individual European Ladies Amateur Championship in Torino, Italy.

In 1993, Sörenstam competed for the University of Texas at Austin in the United States. She won the 1993 individual NCAA Division I Championship title, two years after her elder sister won the same tournament. She also earned All-America honors. While at Texas, Sörenstam was named the winner of the Honda Sports Award for golf.

In 1994, Sörenstam was part of the winning Swedish team at the European Lady Junior's Team Championship at Gutenhof Golf Club, Austria. She also finished second, losing in the final to Maria Hjorth, at the Swedish Match-play Championship at Uppsala Golf Club on the Swedish Golf Tour.

Professional career 
Sörenstam turned professional at the end of the 1994 season and played on the Ladies European Tour in 1995 and 1996. At the end of 1996, she finished second at the LPGA Tour Final Qualifying Tournament to earn exempt status for 1997. She moved to the United States to play on the LPGA Tour, while continuing to play occasionally in Europe.

She has one LPGA Tour win, the 2000 Standard Register PING, and two runner-up finishes, the 1998 Friendly's Classic and 1999 The Philips Invitational. Annika and Charlotta Sörenstam became the first two sisters to both win $1 million on the LPGA Tour.

Her best finish in Europe is second, which she achieved at the 2005 Samsung Ladies Masters and consecutively at the McDonald's WPGA Championship of Europe at Gleneagles in 1996 and 1997.

Sörenstam received the 2004 Mary Bea Porter Award from the Metropolitan Golf Writers Association for saving Donna Caponi from choking during the 2003 LPGA Championship.

Sörenstam represented Europe in the Solheim Cup in 1998 and served as non-playing European captain for the European girls' team in the Junior Solheim Cup in 2005.

Teaching
Since 2007, Sörenstam was Director of Golf Operations and Head Teaching Professional at The Annika Academy, a luxury golf school located south of Orlando, Florida, run by Sörenstam's sister, Annika. She also instructs at IMG academy. Her students included several Symetra Tour, collegiate and LPGA players. The Annika Academy closed on 31 May 2016.

Sörenstam is also a recognized instructor for persons with lower back injuries. She now has the Sorenstam Academy at Charlotte Harbor National Golf Club in North Port, Florida.

Amateur wins
1993 NCAA Division I Championship Individual

Professional wins (3)

LPGA Tour wins (1)

LPGA of Korea Tour wins (1)
2001 Hyundai Securities Ladies Open

Swedish Golf Tour wins (1)
1992 Ängsö Ladies Open (as an amateur)

LPGA Tour career summary

Team appearances
Amateur

 European Girls' Team Championship (representing Sweden): 1991
 European Lady Junior's Team Championship (representing Sweden): 1992, 1994 (winners)
 European Ladies' Team Championship (representing Sweden): 1993

Professional
Solheim Cup (representing Europe): 1998
Source:

Solheim Cup record

References

External links

Texas Longhorns Alumnae corner: Q&A with Charlotta Sorenstam
Profile at Annika Academy official site

Swedish female golfers
Texas Longhorns women's golfers
Ladies European Tour golfers
LPGA Tour golfers
Solheim Cup competitors for Europe
Golfers from Stockholm
1973 births
Living people